Gobernador Dupuy is a department of San Luis Province (Argentina).

References 

Departments of San Luis Province